Awoken Broken is the debut album by the British heavy metal supergroup Primal Rock Rebellion, released on 27 February 2012 through Spinefarm Records. The song "I See Lights" was released as a free download on the project's official website on 2 January. On 26 January the music video for "No Place Like Home" was released along with confirmation that the song will be the album's first single. The album cover was created by Meats Meier.

Track listing
The following is the track listing for Awoken Broken:

Personnel
Primal Rock Rebellion
Mikee Goodman – lead vocals
Adrian Smith – guitar, bass guitar, vocals
Additional musicians
Tarin Kerrey - backing vocals on three tracks
Abi Fry - viola on most songs
Dan "Loord" Foord – drums, percussion
Production
Mikee Goodman - producer
Adrian Smith - producer
Simon Hanhart - mixing

References

2012 debut albums
Primal Rock Rebellion albums
Spinefarm Records albums